The 1998 Baltic Cup football competition was the 18th season of the Baltic Cup. It did not take place, as before, at one single venue. The annual tournament was split up into three separate matches, starting with Latvia against Lithuania on 21 April 1998.

Results

Latvia vs Lithuania

Estonia vs Latvia

Estonia vs Lithuania

Final table

Winners

Statistics

Goalscorers

See also
Balkan Cup
Nordic Football Championship

References

External links
 RSSSF
 RSSSF Details
 omnitel

Baltic Cup (football)
Baltic Cup
Baltic Cup
Baltic Cup
International association football competitions hosted by Latvia
International association football competitions hosted by Estonia